ZSA can refer to:

 The IATA code for San Salvador Airport
 The ISO 639 code for the Sarasira language
 Zonal safety analysis

See also
 Zsa Zsa (or Zsazsa), a given name